Boss & Me is a 2014 Chinese television series starring Hans Zhang and Zhao Liying. It is based on the novel "Shan Shan Comes to Eat" written by Gu Man. The series aired on Jiangsu TV from 8 July to 20 July 2014.

The series was a commercial success in China, topping ratings chart and trending online with viral catchphrases. It is also popular in other countries like Russia and South Korea.

Synopsis
Feng Teng (Hans Zhang) is a rich heir and the president of a giant conglomerate. He has a younger sister, Feng Yue, with a very rare blood type. Therefore, he recruits Shan Shan (Zhao Liying), who shares the same blood type as Feng Yue, into the company to be a blood donor. Interesting anecdotes occur when Feng Teng intentionally tries to fatten up Shan Shan, who loves eating. As Feng Teng gets to know Shan Shan, he discovers her innocence and kind heart beyond her clumsy nature, and falls in love with her.

When Feng Teng's childhood friend, Yuan Lishu (Li Chengyuan) returns to the country, she is dismayed to discover that Feng Teng is in love with Shan Shan. She tries to compete with Shan Shan for Feng Teng's love. Together with Feng Teng's best friend, Zheng Qi (Huang Ming), the two try to separate the couple by inciting conflicts.

Cast

Main
Hans Zhang as Feng Teng
Zhao Liying as Xue Shanshan 
Huang Ming as Zheng Qi
Li Chengyuan as Yuan Lishu

Supporting

People around Feng Teng
Zhang Yang Guo'er as Feng Yue, Feng Teng's sister
Bai Keli as Yan Qing, Feng Yue's husband

People around Shan Shan
Shi Anni as Xue Liuliu, Shan Shan's cousin
Wang Ting as Lu Shuangyi, Shan Shan's best friend
Cui Yongxuan as Du Fan, Shuangyi's boyfriend and Shan Shan's colleague 
Zhu Jian as Shan Shan's father
Zhou Hong as Shan Shan's mother 
Lian Shuliang as Shan Shan's grandfather
Qin Yue as Shan Shan's aunt and Liu Liu's mother
Yao Chenghao as Xue Tongtong, Shan Shan's cousin and Liu Liu's brother

People in Feng Teng Company
Li Fangding as Zhou Xiaowei 
Long Yiyi as Linda 
He Huan as Ah Mei
Cao Shiping as Chief Lian
Liu Yujin as Ah Jia 
Zhang Youyi as Xiao Xuan 
Jiang Dai as Xi Xi 
Han Yan as Qiao Qiao 
Suriya as Cheng Juan

Others
Yang Kailin as Wang Pinruo, Feng Teng's ex-girlfriend
Chai Haowei as You Chenghao, Liu Liu's boyfriend

Soundtrack

Ratings 

 Highest ratings are marked in red, lowest ratings are marked in blue

Awards and nominations

References

External links

2014 Chinese television series debuts
2014 Chinese television series endings
Chinese romantic comedy television series
Dragon Television original programming
Fictional couples
Jiangsu Television original programming
Television series by Croton Media
Television shows based on Chinese novels
Television shows set in China